Bhanwarlal Meghwal (19 November 1948 – 16 November 2020) was an Indian politician from the Indian National Congress. 

He served as the Cabinet Minister of Social Justice and Empowerment in Government of Rajasthan. He also served as the Education Minister in the Government of Rajasthan. 

He was a Member of Rajasthan Legislative Assembly constituency Sujangarh Churu, Rajasthan, serving on 5 different occasions.

Meghwal died on 16 November 2020 after a long illness and brain haemorrhage at the age of 72.

References

1948 births
2020 deaths
Rajasthan MLAs 2008–2013
Rajasthan MLAs 1998–2003
Rajasthani politicians
Rajasthan MLAs 2018–2023
Indian National Congress politicians
United Progressive Alliance candidates in the 2014 Indian general election
Indian National Congress politicians from Rajasthan